The siege of Kars took place during the Russo-Turkish War of 1828–1829. A Russian army, led by General Ivan Paskevich, successfully took Kars in Turkish Armenia from the Ottomans. The battle itself lasted three days, from 20 to 23 June 1828. The capture was almost a complete accident. During the initial stages of the war, a rifleman enacted an unauthorized advancement towards the city and with the Russian army noticing the imminent danger said troop was in, they rushed to their protection which thus resulted in Kars falling after Ottoman troops engaged the Russian position. The Ottoman force, numbering some 11,000 men before the siege, lost 2,000 men and 151 artillery guns. The Russian contingent lost 400 men.

References

Sources
 

Kars
Kars
History of Kars
Kars 1828
Kars 1828